Jasper De Plus (born 11 June 1997) is a Belgian cyclist, who currently rides for UCI WorldTeam . He is the younger brother of fellow racing cyclist Laurens De Plus.

Major results
2015
 8th Overall Ronde des Vallées
2019
 1st Chrono des Nations U23 
 2nd Time trial, National Under–23 Road Championships

References

External links

1997 births
Living people
Belgian male cyclists
Sportspeople from Aalst, Belgium
Cyclists from East Flanders